Group A of the 2017 Fed Cup Europe/Africa Zone Group II was one of 2 pools in the Europe/Africa zone of the 2017 Fed Cup. Four teams competed in a round robin competition, with the top two teams and the bottom two teams proceeding to their respective sections of the play-offs: the top two teams played for advancement to Group I, while the bottom two teams faced potential relegation to Group III.

Standings 

Standings are determined by: 1. number of wins; 2. if two teams have the same number of wins, head-to-head record; 3. if three teams have the same number of wins, (a) number of matches won in the group, then (b) percentage of sets won in the group, then (c) percentage of games won in the group, then (d) Fed Cup rankings.

Round-robin

Sweden vs. Slovenia

South Africa vs. Norway

Sweden vs. Norway

South Africa vs. Slovenia

Sweden vs. South Africa

Norway vs. Slovenia

References

External links 
 Fed Cup website

A2